The 1907 Iowa State Cyclones football team represented Iowa State College of Agricultural and Mechanic Arts (later renamed Iowa State University) as an independent during the 1907 college football season. In their first season under head coach Clyde Williams, the Cyclones compiled a 6–2 record, shut out four of eight opponents, and outscored all opponents by a combined total of 138 to 40. Ralph McElhinney was the team captain.

Between 1892 and 1913, the football team played on a field that later became the site of the university's Parks Library. The field was known as State Field; when the new field opened in 1914, it became known as "New State Field".

Schedule

References

Iowa State
Iowa State Cyclones football seasons
Iowa State Cyclones football